Luther Preston Johnston (October 12, 1920 – January 15, 1979) was an American football fullback.

Johnston was born in Newcastle, Texas, in 1920 and attended Newcastle High School in that city. He played college football at SMU. 

He played professional football for the Miami Seahawks and Buffalo Bisons of the All-America Football Conference in 1946.  He appeared in 11 games, seven of them as a starter. He rushed for 218 yards and two touchdowns on 45 carries. 

He died in 1979 in Lubbock, Texas.

References

1920 births
1979 deaths
American football fullbacks
Miami Seahawks players
Buffalo Bisons (AAFC) players
SMU Mustangs football players
Players of American football from Texas